Bertrand Petit (born 28 August 1964) is a French politician from the Socialist Party (NUPES) who has been the member of the National Assembly for Pas-de-Calais's 8th constituency since 2022. His original election was invalidated, and he was re-elected in a by-election held in 2023.

See also 

 List of deputies of the 16th National Assembly of France

References 

1964 births
Living people
People from Saint-Omer
Socialist Party (France) politicians
Deputies of the 16th National Assembly of the French Fifth Republic
21st-century French politicians
Members of Parliament for Pas-de-Calais